Anthony Grey  (born 5 July 1938) is a British journalist and author. While working for Reuters, he was imprisoned by the Chinese government for 27 months from 1967 to 1969. He has written a series of historical novels and non-fiction books, including several relating to his detention.

Career

Detention in China (1967–1969)
In July 1967, while working for Reuters in Beijing covering China's Cultural Revolution, Grey was confined to the basement of his house by the Chinese government under the leadership of Mao Zedong, ostensibly for spying but really in retaliation for the colonial British government jailing eight pro-Chinese media journalists who had violated emergency regulations during the leftist riots in British Hong Kong.

China demanded the release of the eight to secure Grey's release. While the eight were eventually let go, China then demanded the release of a further thirteen Chinese people jailed in British Hong Kong. This was refused. Grey was able to communicate by mail with his mother and girlfriend back in England, but was only allowed two 20-minute visits by British consular officials in the first 17 months of his confinement, and was never formally charged. During his confinement, a group of Red Guards broke into his house and killed his cat. 

He was released in October 1969, after 27 months of captivity. Upon his return to Britain, he was awarded the "Journalist of the Year" prize for 1969 at the IPC National Press awards, and an OBE.

Grey wrote about his two-year ordeal in Hostage in Peking, published in 1970. (Peking is a former name of Beijing.)

Later career
He published various stories and articles in such magazines as Playboy, Punch and The Illustrated London News. Between 1974 and 1979 he was a presenter on 24 Hours, a daily international affairs programme on the BBC's World Service.

In 1983, Grey published The Prime Minister Was a Spy, in which he claimed that Harold Holt (prime minister of Australia from 1966 to 1967) was a spy for Communist China, and that he had not drowned, but in fact had been "collected" by a Chinese submarine and lived out the rest of his life in Beijing. The book was widely ridiculed, and Holt's biographer Tom Frame has described it as "a complete fabrication".

He produced television documentaries for the British TV stations BBC and ATV World. These include Return to Peking in which he described changes in China since his imprisonment, and Return to Saigon, in which he visited Vietnam for the first time, subsequent to his successful novel Saigon.

In the late 1980s, Grey's experience as a political hostage led him to found Hostage Action Worldwide, which worked for the release of other political hostages, in particular John McCarthy, Brian Keenan, Terry Waite and others held by Islamic groups in the Middle East.

From the 1990s, Grey took an interest in UFOs. He produced a three-part documentary in 1996 and 1997 for the BBC World Service entitled UFO's - Fact, Fiction or Fantasy?. His conclusion was that there is overwhelming evidence for visitations to earth by extra-terrestrials.

Personal life
In 1970, Grey married Shirley McGuinn (16 December 1932 – 24 November 1995), his girlfriend at the time of his imprisonment in China. They had two daughters, and divorced in 1992. From 1969 to 1973, the Greys lived in Jersey, and subsequently in London, West Sussex and Norwich.

Publications
Grey's publications include:

Fiction 
Novels
 Some Put Their Trust in Chariots (1973)
 The Bulgarian Exclusive (1976)
 The Chinese Assassin (1978)
 Saigon (1982)
 The Prime Minister Was a Spy (1983)
 Peking: A Novel of China's Revolution, 1921-1978 (1988)
 The Bangkok Secret (1990) based around the real-life mysterious shooting death of Thailand's King Rama VIII
 The Naked Angels (1990)
 A Gallery of Nudes (1992)
 Tokyo Bay (1996)
 The German Stratagem (1998)

Short story collections
 A Man Alone (1972)
 What is the Universe In? (2003)

Non-fiction 
 Hostage in Peking (1970) recounting his experiences in Chinese captivity
 Crosswords from Peking (1975)
 Hostage in Peking Plus (2008)
 The Hostage Handbook: The Secret Diary of a Two-Year Ordeal in China (2009)

References

External links 
"The Tiny World of Anthony Grey". Time. 20 December 1968.
Anthony Grey Archive. University of East Anglia.

English male journalists
English writers
Writers from Norwich
Living people
1938 births
British people imprisoned abroad
Prisoners and detainees of the People's Republic of China
British expatriates in China